Marco Alessandro Punzal Casambre (born December 18, 1998) is a Filipino professional footballer who plays for Philippines Football League club Kaya–Iloilo and the Philippines national team.

Education
Casambre studied at Claret School of Quezon City where he graduated with first honorable mention. He entered the University of the Philippines to take up a course on Sports Science.

Collegiate career
Casambre plays for the UP Fighting Maroons collegiate football team. He was part of the squad that won the 2016 University Games in Dumaguete.

Club career

Youth
He once played for the Kaya Elite youth team.

Ceres
Casambre previously played for Ceres F.C. of the then-existing United Football League before moving to Global F.C.

Global Cebu
He made his starting player debut in an international club competition with Global at the 2016 Singapore Cup in a match against Cambodian club Nagaworld FC on May 28, 2016. He played for Global, which renamed itself as Global Cebu when it joined the Philippines Football League (PFL).

Davao Aguilas
In July 2018, he moved to Davao Aguilas. His club would later decide to dissolve its first team in December 2018 leaving him without a club.

Chainat Hornbill
In January 2019, Casambre signed with the Chainat Hornbill of the Thai League 1.

Kaya–Iloilo
In 2020, Casambre returned to the Philippines and joined Kaya–Iloilo.

Loan to Sukhothai
In January 2022, Casambre was sent out on loan to Thai League 2 club Sukhothai until June 2022.

International career

Philippines youth
In 2011, Casambre is among the players that composed the Philippine national under-13 team that participated in the AFC U13 Festival of Football in Malaysia. In 2012, Casambre played for the Philippine national under-14 team which participated at the six-nation Japan-East Asean Football Exchange Programme U-14 Youth Football Festival hosted in Osaka. The youth team finished third in the said tournament.

Philippines U19
He later became part of the under-19 team and was part of the squad that participated at the 2015 AFF U-19 Youth Championship. He made his debut for Philippines U19 in a 1−2 win against Brunei U19.

Philippines U22
Casambre was part of the Philippines U22 squad that competed in the 2019 Southeast Asian Games held in Philippines.

Philippines
In March 2016, he was among the 35 players called up by the Philippine Football Federation to participate in a training camp with the senior national team which was preparing for two then upcoming 2018 FIFA World Cup qualifier matches.

Casambre impressed Philippine head coach Thomas Dooley during training. Dooley described the footballer as "awake" and "there", complimented his play using his left foot, noted his minimal mistakes when passing out of the back, and remarked that his "good in the air". This led to the Philippine mentor to select him as one of the starting players in the Philippines match against Thailand on November 25, 2016, the team's final group stage match at the 2016 AFF Championship. He was later subbed out in his international debut match for Kevin Ingreso in the 79th minute.

References

1998 births
Living people
Filipino footballers
Global Makati F.C. players
Ceres–Negros F.C. players
Marco Casambre
Philippines international footballers
Association football central defenders
Sportspeople from Quezon City
University Athletic Association of the Philippines footballers
University of the Philippines alumni
Competitors at the 2019 Southeast Asian Games
Southeast Asian Games competitors for the Philippines